Santana do São Francisco is a municipality located in the Brazilian state of Sergipe. Its population was 7,844 (2020) and its area is 46 km2.

References

Municipalities in Sergipe